Mérignac Centre tram stop  is a tram stop on line A of the Tramway de Bordeaux, and served as terminus of that line between 21 June 2007, when the line was extended from Saint-Augustin, until 24 January 2015, when the line was extended to Le Haillan-Rostand.. The stop is located on Avenue du Maréchal Leclerc in the commune of Mérignac and is operated by the TBC.

For most of the day on Mondays to Fridays, trams run at least every five minutes in both directions through the stop. Services run less frequently in the early morning, late evenings, weekends and public holidays.

Interchanges

TBC Network

Trans Gironde Network

Close by
 Collège Jules Ferry
 Police
 Gendarmerie
 Médiathèque
 Mérignac Ciné

References 

Bordeaux tramway stops
Tram stops in Mérignac
Railway stations in France opened in 2007